Marywadea is a genus of Ediacaran biota shaped like an oval with a central ridge. It is a bilaterian organism as evidenced by its symmetry, vaguely resembling a very primitive trilobite. The fossil has an asymmetrical first chamber of the quilt. It has transverse ridges away from the central axis that may be gonads.  The head is shaped as a semicircle and is the same width as the rest of the body.  The ridges number about 50.  There are two oval shapes below the head.

Marywadea ovata is the only described species of the genus. Originally M. ovata was grouped under the genus Spriggina, but recent research has moved the species into its own genus. It is most often interpreted as an early arthropod, annelid, or a member of  Proarticulata, but as with all Ediacarian fauna its phylogeny remains uncertain. Initially, it was described as the second species of Spriggina. The genus was established by Martin Glaessner in 1976, who named it after fellow paleontologist Mary Wade, with whom he had described the species ten years earlier.

See also
List of Ediacaran genera

References

Sprigginidae
Ediacaran life
Prehistoric bilaterian genera
Prehistoric invertebrates of Australia